A486 may refer to:

 A486 road (Wales)
 RFA Regent (A486), a ship